Richard E. Foglesong is an American historian and political scientist who focuses on Florida and U.S. politics, New Urbanism and the politics of urban development, Hispanic politics, and the history of Walt Disney World and the Reedy Creek Improvement District. He is the George and Harriet Cornell Professor of Politics, Emeritus at Rollins College.

Education and career
Foglesong earned his M.A. in urban affairs and his Ph.D. in political science at the University of Chicago, where he was a Ford Foundation Urban Fellow. He began his teaching career at Amherst College, and joined Rollins College in 1984. In 1990, he went on leave from Rollins to take a temporary appointment at the University of California, Los Angeles, as the Harvey Perloff Professor of Urban Planning. He retired in 2018.

Books
Foglesong's books include:
Planning the Capitalist City: The Colonial Era to the 1920s (Princeton University Press, 1986)
Married to the Mouse: Walt Disney World and Orlando (Yale University Press, 2001)
Immigrant Prince: Mel Martinez and the American Dream (University Press, of Florida, 2011)

References

1948 births
University of Chicago alumni
Living people
Writers from Enid, Oklahoma
Historians from Oklahoma
Rollins College faculty
20th-century American historians
20th-century American male writers
21st-century American historians
21st-century American male writers
American male non-fiction writers